Longjing may refer to:
Tea
Longjing tea (龙井茶), a variety of green tea from Hangzhou, Zhejiang
Longjing, Hangzhou (龙井村), production site of Longjing tea, located in Hangzhou
City and town
Longjing, Jilin (龙井市), county-level city of Yanbian Prefecture, Jilin
Longjing, Qingxin County (龙颈镇), town in Guangdong
Townships (龙井乡)
Longjing Township, Wushan County, Chongqing, in Wushan County, Chongqing
Longjing Township, Renhuai, in Renhuai City, Guizhou
Longjing Township, Shiqian County, in Shiqian County, Guizhou
Longjing Township, Xinyang, in Pingqiao District, Xinyang, Henan
District
Longjing, Taichung (龍井區), Taiwan
Station
Longjing railway station (龍井車站), a railway station on the Taiwan Railway Administration Western Line 
Food
Longjing prawns (龙井虾仁), specialty of Hangzhou, produced using the meat of live river prawns

See also
 Ryūsei (disambiguation)